The Café Gondrée is a small coffeehouse in the French community of Bénouville. The cafe is located on the west bank of the Caen Canal, at the northwest end of the Bénouville Bridge, now commonly referred to as the Pegasus Bridge. The building was the site of first combat during the D-Day invasion, and is best known for its role commemorating those events.

History

The two-story red brick building was built at the end of the 19th century. The nearby Bénouville Bridge was a key objective of the British 6th Airborne Division. A unit of Glider infantry of the division's 2nd Battalion was to land, take the bridge intact and hold it until relieved. The unit was led by Major John Howard. Howard and his men boarded three gliders. Released at 8,000 feet in the pitch black of a storm filled night, all three gliders managed to make a rough landing in a field almost directly on top of their objective. Leaving the broken gliders, the men engaged in a short, fierce firefight which ended with the British paratroopers in control of the bridge. Three British paratroopers entered the café at 6:20 am on 6 June 1944, thereby liberating it.

At the time of these events the café was run by Georges and Thérèse Gondrée. They had been involved in the French Resistance, and had passed on information about the defenses around the bridge to British intelligence through the French underground. The successful taking of the bridge played an important role in limiting the effectiveness of a German counter-attack in the days and weeks following the Normandy invasion. With the passing of the Gondrées, ownership was taken over by their daughter, Arlette Gondrée, who was a little girl of 5 at the time of their liberation. A determined, fiery woman, she is famously referred to simply as "Madame".

After the war

The structure is arguably the first French house to be liberated. After the war the café became a place of honor for the men who came and fought in the Normandy campaign. British paratroopers also celebrate the D-day anniversary at the café every 5 June. Every June 5, at 11:16 pm, she offers champagne to the veterans present. The walls of the café are decorated with shoulder patch badges, regimental insignia, old uniforms, helmets and photos of the leaders of the operation.

The café was also a destination for speakers at the military lectures that the war colleges put on in Normandy in the summers each year. Officers involved in the Normandy battles were asked by the war colleges to return to Normandy and speak of their experiences fighting there, and included such men as Major General "Pip" Roberts, Brigadier David Stileman, Major John Howard and Colonel Hans von Luck, an officer with the 21st Panzer Division. Because the owners were still severely anti-German, Howard covered for Luck by passing him off as Swedish.

The Café Gondrée still serves as a café, though it is now known as the Pegasus Bridge Café. On 5 June 1987 it was listed as an Historical Monument.

References
Citations

Bibliography

 

Bascule bridges
Buildings and structures in Calvados (department)
Military history of France during World War II
Military history of Normandy
British airborne landings in Normandy
World War II sites in France
Tourist attractions in Calvados (department)
Operation Overlord
Coffeehouses and cafés in France